Novolyapichev is a rural locality (a khutor) in Lyapichevskoye Rural Settlement, Kalachyovsky District, Volgograd Oblast, Russia. The population was 360 as of 2010. There are 5 streets.

Geography 
Novolyapichev is located 54 km south of Kalach-na-Donu (the district's administrative centre) by road. Novopetrovsky is the nearest rural locality.

References 

Rural localities in Kalachyovsky District